Sweevo's World is an isometric 3D arcade adventure game released by Gargoyle Games in 1986 for the ZX Spectrum and Amstrad CPC. An enhanced version for the Spectrum 128K was also released, titled Sweevo's Whirled. The game was followed by a sequel, Hydrofool.

The game was partially inspired by the Laurel and Hardy films, with Sweevo modelled on Stan Laurel.

Plot 
The artificial planetoid Knutz Folly has been overrun by the bizarre genetic experiments of the mad Baron Knutz. It's up to the robot SWEEVO (Self Willed Extreme Environment Vocational Organism) to clean the place up and thereby achieve Active Status.

Gameplay 
Sweevo must find and destroy the malfunctioning Waste Ingestion and Janitor Units ("Wijus") that are supposed to keep Knutz Folly clean, while avoiding various hostile creatures and structures. Among the other characters inhabiting Knutz Folly are the Goose Which Laid The Golden Erg (sic), the Horrible Little Girls ("Minxes"), and the Goose-Stepping Dictators. "Brownies" may be collected for additional brownie points.

Sweevo cannot jump and must rely on elevators to climb obstacles. He is not armed but can kill enemies by dropping objects on them or manoeuvring them into traps.

References

External links 

1986 video games
Action-adventure games
Amstrad CPC games
Gargoyle Games games
Single-player video games
Video games developed in the United Kingdom
Video games with isometric graphics
ZX Spectrum games